Michael Blees (6 August 1962 – 7 April 1985) was an Australian rules footballer who represented the St Kilda Football Club in the Victorian Football League (VFL) during the 1980s.

References

External links
 
 

1962 births
1985 deaths
St Kilda Football Club players
Frankston Bombers players
Australian rules footballers from Victoria (Australia)